The 1997 Italian Open was a tennis tournament played on outdoor clay courts. It was the 54th edition of the Italian Open and was part of the ATP Super 9 of the 1997 ATP Tour and of Tier I of the 1997 WTA Tour. Both the men's and women's events were held at the Foro Italico in Rome, Italy. The women's tournament was played from 5 May until 11 May 1997, and the men's tournament was played from 12 May until 19 May 1997. Àlex Corretja and Mary Pierce won the singles titles.

Finals

Men's singles

 Àlex Corretja defeated  Marcelo Ríos 7–5, 7–5, 6–3
 It was Corretja's 3rd title of the year and the 5th of his career. It was his 1st Masters title.

Women's singles

 Mary Pierce defeated  Conchita Martínez 6–4, 6–0
 It was Pierce's 2nd title of the year and the 11th of her career. It was her 1st Tier I title.

Men's doubles

 Mark Knowles /  Daniel Nestor defeated  Byron Black /  Alex O'Brien 6–3, 4–6, 7–5
 It was Knowles' 2nd title of the year and the 11th of his career. It was Nestor's 2nd title of the year and the 8th of his career.

Women's doubles

 Nicole Arendt /  Manon Bollegraf defeated  Conchita Martínez /  Patricia Tarabini 6–2, 6–4
 It was Arendt's 2nd title of the year and the 11th of her career. It was Bollegraf's 3rd title of the year and the 26th of her career.

References

External links
Official website

 
Italian Open
Italian Open
Italian Open
Italian Open (tennis)